Militarism is the belief or the desire of a government or a people that a state should maintain a strong military capability and to use it aggressively to expand national interests and/or values. It may also imply the glorification of the military and of the ideals of a professional military class and the "predominance of the armed forces in the administration or policy of the state" (see also: stratocracy and military junta).

Militarism has been a significant element of the imperialist or expansionist ideologies of many nations throughout history. Some notable cases include the Ancient Assyrian Empire, the Greek city state of Sparta, the Roman Empire, the Aztec nation, the Mongol Empire, the Zulu Kingdom, the Kingdom of Prussia, the Habsburg/Habsburg-Lorraine monarchies, the Ottoman Empire, the Empire of Japan, the Russian Empire, Soviet Union, North Korea, the United States of America, Nazi Germany, the Italian Empire during the rule of Benito Mussolini, the German Empire, the British Empire, and the First French Empire.

By nation

Germany

The roots of German militarism can be found in 18th- and 19th-century Prussia and the subsequent unification of Germany under Prussian leadership. However, Hans Rosenberg sees its origin already in the Teutonic Order and its colonization of Prussia during the late Middle Ages, when mercenaries from the Holy Roman Empire were granted lands by the Order and gradually formed a new landed militarist Prussian nobility, from which the Junker nobility would later evolve.

During the 17th-century reign of the "Great Elector" Frederick William, Elector of Brandenburg, Brandenburg-Prussia increased its military to 40,000 men and began an effective military administration overseen by the General War Commissariat. In order to bolster his power both in interior and foreign matters, so-called Soldatenkönig ("soldier king") Frederick William I of Prussia started his large-scale military reforms in 1713, thus beginning the country's tradition of a high military budget by increasing the annual military spending to 73% of the entire annual budget of Prussia. By the time of his death in 1740, the Prussian Army had grown into a standing army of 83,000 men, one of the largest in Europe, at a time when the entire Prussian populace made up 2.5 million people. Prussian military writer Georg Henirich von Berenhorst would later write in hindsight that ever since the reign of the soldier king, Prussia always remained "not a country with an army, but an army with a country" (a quote often misattributed to Voltaire and Honoré Gabriel Riqueti, comte de Mirabeau).

After Napoleon Bonaparte defeated Prussia in 1806, one of the conditions of peace was that Prussia should reduce its army to no more than 42,000 men.  In order that the country should not again be so defeated, the King of Prussia enrolled the permitted number of men for one year, trained and then dismissed that group, and enrolled another of the same size, and so on. Thus, in the course of ten years, he was able to gather an army of 420,000 men who had at least one year of military training.  The officers of the army were drawn almost entirely from among the land-owning nobility.  The result was that there was gradually built up a large class of professional officers on the one hand, and a much larger class, the rank and file of the army, on the other.  These enlisted men had become conditioned to obey implicitly all the commands of the officers, creating a class-based culture of deference.

This system led to several consequences. Since the officer class also furnished most of the officials for the civil administration of the country, the interests of the army came to be considered as identical to the interests of the country as a whole. A second result was that the governing class desired to continue a system which gave them so much power over the common people, contributing to the continuing influence of the Junker noble classes.

Militarism in Germany continued after World War I and the fall of the German monarchy in the German Revolution of 1918–1919, in spite of Allied attempts to crush German militarism by means of the Treaty of Versailles, as the Allies saw Prussian and German militarism as one of the major causes of the Great War. During the period of the Weimar Republic (1918–1933), the 1920 Kapp Putsch, an attempted coup d'état against the republican government, was launched by disaffected members of the armed forces. After this event, some of the more radical militarists and nationalists were submerged in grief and despair into the NSDAP party of Adolf Hitler, while more moderate elements of militarism declined and remained affiliated with the German National People's Party (DNVP) instead.

Throughout its entire 14-year existence, the Weimar Republic remained under threat of militaristic nationalism, as many Germans felt the Treaty of Versailles humiliated their militaristic culture.  The Weimar years saw large-scale right-wing militarist and paramilitary mass organizations such as Der Stahlhelm as well as illegal underground militias such as the Freikorps and the Black Reichswehr.  Formed as early as 1920, out of the latter two soon rose the Sturmabteilung (SA), the paramilitary branch of the Nazi party.  All of these were responsible for the political violence of so-called Feme murders and an overall atmosphere of lingering civil war during the Weimar period.  During the Weimar era, mathematician and political writer Emil Julius Gumbel published in-depth analyses of the militarist paramilitary violence characterizing German public life as well as the state's lenient to sympathetic reaction to it if the violence was committed by the political right.

Nazi Germany was a strongly militarist state; after its defeat in 1945, militarism in German culture was dramatically reduced as a backlash against the Nazi period, and the Allied Control Council and later the Allied High Commission oversaw a program of attempted fundamental re-education of the German people at large in order to put a stop to German militarism once and for all.

The Federal Republic of Germany today maintains a large, modern military and has one of the highest defence budgets in the world; at 1.3 percent of Germany's GDP, it is, in 2019, similar in cash terms to those of the United Kingdom, France and Japan, at around US$50bn.

India

The rise of militarism in India dates back to the British Raj with the establishment of several Indian independence movement organizations such as the Indian National Army led by Subhas Chandra Bose. The Indian National Army (INA) played a crucial role in pressuring the British Raj after it occupied the Andaman and Nicobar Islands with the help of Imperial Japan, but the movement lost momentum due to lack of support by the Indian National Congress, the Battle of Imphal, and Bose's sudden death.

After India gained independence in 1947, tensions with neighbouring Pakistan over the Kashmir dispute and other issues led the Indian government to emphasize military preparedness (see also the political integration of India).  After the Sino-Indian War in 1962, India dramatically expanded its military which helped India win the Indo-Pakistani War of 1971. India became third Asian country in the world to possess nuclear weapons, culminating in the tests of 1998. The Kashmiri insurgency and recent events including the Kargil War against Pakistan, assured that the Indian government remained committed to military expansion.

In recent years the government has increased the military expenditure across all branches and embarked on a rapid modernization programme.

Israel
Israel's many Arab–Israeli conflicts since the Declaration of the Establishment of the State have led to a prominence of security and defense in politics and civil society, resulting in many of Israel's former high-ranking military leaders becoming top politicians: Yitzhak Rabin, Ariel Sharon, Ezer Weizman, Ehud Barak, Shaul Mofaz, Moshe Dayan, Yitzhak Mordechai, Amram Mitzna and Benny Gantz.

Japan

In parallel with 20th-century German militarism, Japanese militarism began with a series of events by which the military gained prominence in dictating Japan's affairs. This was evident in 15th-century Japan's Sengoku period or Age of Warring States, where powerful samurai warlords (daimyōs) played a significant role in Japanese politics. Japan's militarism is deeply rooted in the ancient samurai tradition, centuries before Japan's modernization. Even though a militarist philosophy was intrinsic to the shogunates, a nationalist style of militarism developed after the Meiji Restoration, which restored the Emperor to power and began the Empire of Japan.  It is exemplified by the 1882 Imperial Rescript to Soldiers and Sailors, which called for all members of the armed forces to have an absolute personal loyalty to the Emperor.

In the 20th century (approximately in the 1920s), two factors contributed both to the power of the military and chaos within its ranks. One was the "Military Ministers to be Active-Duty Officers Law", which required the Imperial Japanese Army (IJA) and Imperial Japanese Navy (IJN) to agree to the Ministry of Army position in the Cabinet. This essentially gave the military veto power over the formation of any Cabinet in the ostensibly parliamentary country. Another factor was gekokujō, or institutionalized disobedience by junior officers.  It was not uncommon for radical junior officers to press their goals, to the extent of assassinating their seniors. In 1936, this phenomenon resulted in the February 26 Incident, in which junior officers attempted a coup d'état and killed leading members of the Japanese government. The rebellion enraged Emperor Hirohito and he ordered its suppression, which was successfully carried out by loyal members of the military.

In the 1930s, the Great Depression wrecked Japan's economy and gave radical elements within the Japanese military the chance to realize their ambitions of conquering all of Asia. In 1931, the Kwantung Army (a Japanese military force stationed in Manchuria) staged the Mukden Incident, which sparked the Invasion of Manchuria and its transformation into the Japanese puppet state of Manchukuo. Six years later, the Marco Polo Bridge Incident outside Peking sparked the Second Sino-Japanese War (1937–1945). Japanese troops streamed into China, conquering Peking, Shanghai, and the national capital of Nanking; the last conquest was followed by the Nanking Massacre. In 1940, Japan entered into an alliance with Nazi Germany and Fascist Italy, two similarly militaristic states in Europe, and advanced out of China and into Southeast Asia. This brought about the intervention of the United States, which embargoed all petroleum to Japan. The embargo eventually precipitated the Attack on Pearl Harbor and the entry of the U.S. into World War II.

In 1945, Japan surrendered to the United States, beginning the Occupation of Japan and the purging of all militarist influences from Japanese society and politics. In 1947, the new Constitution of Japan supplanted the Meiji Constitution as the fundamental law of the country, replacing the rule of the Emperor with parliamentary government. With this event, the Empire of Japan officially came to an end and the modern State of Japan was founded.

North Korea

Sŏn'gun (often transliterated "songun"), North Korea's "Military First" policy, regards military power as the highest priority of the country. This has escalated so much in the DPRK that one in five people serves in the armed forces, and the military has become one of the largest in the world.

Songun elevates the Korean People's Armed Forces within North Korea as an organization and as a state function, granting it the primary position in the North Korean government and society. The principle guides domestic policy and international interactions.
It provides the framework of the government, designating the military as the "supreme repository of power". It also facilitates the militarization of non-military sectors by emphasizing the unity of the military and the people by spreading military culture among the masses. The North Korean government grants the Korean People's Army as the highest priority in the economy and in resource-allocation, and positions it as the model for society to emulate. 
Songun is also the ideological concept behind a shift in policies (since the death of Kim Il-sung in 1994) which emphasize the people's military over all other aspects of state and the interests of the military comes first before the masses (workers).

Philippines

In the pre-colonial era, the Filipino people had their own forces, divided between the islands which each had its own ruler. They were called Sandig (Guards), Kawal (Knights), and  Tanod. They also served as the police and watchers on the land, coastlines and seas. In 1521, the Visayan king of Mactan Lapu-Lapu of Cebu, organized the first recorded military action against the Spanish colonizers, in the Battle of Mactan.

In the 19th century during the Philippine Revolution, Andrés Bonifacio founded the Katipunan, a revolutionary organization against Spain at the Cry of Pugad Lawin. Some notable battles were the Siege of Baler, the Battle of Imus, Battle of Kawit, Battle of Nueva Ecija, the victorious Battle of Alapan and the famous Twin Battles of Binakayan and Dalahican. During Independence, the President General Emilio Aguinaldo established the Magdalo, a faction separate from Katipunan, and he declared the revolutionary government in the constitution of the First Philippine Republic.

During the Filipino-American War, the General Antonio Luna as a high-ranking general, he ordered a conscription to all citizens, a mandatory form of national service (at any war) for the increase the density and the manpower of the Philippine Army.

During the World War II, the Philippines was one of the participants, as a member of Allied forces, the Philippines with the U.S. forces fought the Imperial Japanese Army (1942–1945), one of the notable battles is the victorious Battle of Manila, which also called "The Liberation".

During the 1970s the President Ferdinand Marcos declared P.D.1081 or martial law, which also made the Philippines a garrison state. By the Philippine Constabulary (PC) and Integrated National Police (INP), the high school or secondary and college education have a compulsory curriculum concerning the military, and nationalism which is the "Citizens Military Training" (CMT) and  "Reserve Officers Training Corps" (ROTC).
But in 1986, when the constitution changed, this form of national service training program became non-compulsory but still part of the basic education.

Russia

Russia has also had a long history of militarism continuing on to the present day driven by its desire to protect its western frontier which has no natural buffers between potential invaders from the rest of continental Europe and her heartlands in European Russia. Ever since Peter the Great's reforms, Russia became one of Europe's great powers in terms of political and military strength. Through the Imperial era, Russia continued on her quest for territorial expansion into Siberia, Caucasus and into Eastern Europe, eventually conquering the majority of the Polish-Lithuanian Commonwealth.

The end of imperial rule in 1917 meant the loss of some territory following the treaty of Brest-Litovsk, but much of it was quickly reconquered by the Soviet Union later on, including events such as the partition of Poland and reconquest of the Baltic states in the late 1930s and ‘40s. Soviet influence reached its peak after WWII in the Cold War era, during which the Soviet Union occupied virtually all of Eastern Europe in a military alliance known as the Warsaw Pact, with the Soviet Army playing a key role. All this was lost with the dissolution of the Soviet Union in 1991. Russia was greatly weakened in what Russia's second President Vladimir Putin called the greatest geopolitical disaster of the 20th century. Nevertheless, under Putin's leadership, a resurgent modern Russia has maintained a tremendous amount of geopolitical influence in the countries spawned from the dissolution of the Soviet Union, and modern Russia remains Eastern Europe's leading, if not dominant, power.

Turkey

Militarism has a long history in Turkey.

The Ottoman Empire lasted for centuries and always relied on its military might, but militarism was not a part of everyday life. Militarism was only introduced into daily life with the advent of modern institutions, particularly schools, which became part of the state apparatus when the Ottoman Empire was succeeded by a new nation state – the Republic of Turkey – in 1923. The founders of the republic were determined to break with the past and modernise the country. There was, however, an inherent contradiction in that their modernist vision was limited by their military roots. The leading reformers were all military men and, in keeping with the military tradition, all believed in the authority and the sacredness of the state. The public also believed in the military. It was the military, after all, who led the nation through the War of Liberation (1919–1923) and saved the motherland.

The first military coup in the history of the republic was on 27 May 1960, which resulted in the hanging of PM Adnan Menderes and 2 ministers, and a new constitution was introduced, creating a Constitutional Court to vet the legislation passed by parliament, and a military-dominated National Security Council to oversee the government affairs similar to the politburo in the Soviet Union. The second military coup took place on 12 March 1971, this time only forcing the government to resign and installing a cabinet of technocrats and bureaucrats without dissolving the parliament. The third military coup took place on 12 September 1980, which resulted in the dissolution of parliament and all political parties as well as imposition of a much more authoritarian constitution. There was another military intervention that was called a "post-modern coup" on 28 February 1997 which merely forced the government to resign, and finally an unsuccessful military coup attempt on 15 July 2016.

The constitutional referendums in 2010 and 2017 have changed the composition and role of the National Security Council, and placed the armed forces under the control of civilian government.

United States

In the late nineteenth and early twentieth centuries political and military leaders reformed the US federal government to establish a stronger central government than had ever previously existed for the purpose of enabling the nation to pursue an imperial policy in the Pacific and in the Caribbean and economic militarism to support the development of the new industrial economy. This reform was the result of a conflict between Neo-Hamiltonian Republicans and Jeffersonian-Jacksonian Democrats over the proper administration of the state and direction of its foreign policy. The conflict pitted proponents of professionalism, based on business management principles, against those favoring more local control in the hands of laymen and political appointees. The outcome of this struggle, including a more professional federal civil service and a strengthened presidency and executive branch, made a more expansionist foreign policy possible.

After the end of the American Civil War the national army fell into disrepair. Reforms based on various European states including Britain, Germany, and Switzerland were made so that it would become responsive to control from the central government, prepared for future conflicts, and develop refined command and support structures; these reforms led to the development of professional military thinkers and cadre.

During this time the ideas of Social Darwinism helped propel American overseas expansion in the Pacific and Caribbean. This required modifications for a more efficient central government due to the added administration requirements (see above).

The enlargement of the U.S. Army for the Spanish–American War was considered essential to the occupation and control of the new territories acquired from Spain in its defeat (Guam, the Philippines, Puerto Rico, and Cuba). The previous limit by legislation of 24,000 men was expanded to 60,000 regulars in the new army bill on 2 February 1901, with allowance at that time for expansion to 80,000 regulars by presidential discretion at times of national emergency.

U.S. forces were again enlarged immensely for World War I. Officers such as George S. Patton were permanent captains at the start of the war and received temporary promotions to colonel.

Between the first and second world wars, the US Marine Corps engaged in questionable activities in the Banana Wars in Latin America. Retired Major General Smedley Butler, who was at the time of his death the most decorated Marine, spoke strongly against what he considered to be trends toward fascism and militarism.  Butler briefed Congress on what he described as a Business Plot for a military coup, for which he had been suggested as leader; the matter was partially corroborated, but the real threat has been disputed. The Latin American expeditions ended with Franklin D. Roosevelt's Good Neighbor policy of 1934.

After World War II, there were major cutbacks, such that units responding early in the Korean War under United Nations authority (e.g., Task Force Smith) were unprepared, resulting in catastrophic performance. When Harry S. Truman fired Douglas MacArthur, the tradition of civilian control held and MacArthur left without any hint of military coup.

The Cold War resulted in serious permanent military buildups. Dwight D. Eisenhower, a retired top military commander elected as a civilian President, warned, as he was leaving office, of the development of a military–industrial complex. In the Cold War, there emerged many civilian academics and industrial researchers, such as Henry Kissinger and Herman Kahn, who had significant input into the use of military force.  The complexities of nuclear strategy and the debates surrounding them helped produce a new group of 'defense intellectuals' and think tanks, such as the Rand Corporation (where Kahn, among others, worked).

It has been argued that the United States has shifted to a state of neomilitarism since the end of the Vietnam War. This form of militarism is distinguished by the reliance on a relatively small number of volunteer fighters; heavy reliance on complex technologies; and the rationalization and expansion of government advertising and recruitment programs designed to promote military service.

Venezuela

Militarism in Venezuela follows the cult and myth of Simón Bolívar, known as the liberator of Venezuela. For much of the 1800s, Venezuela was ruled by powerful, militarist leaders known as caudillos. Between 1892 and 1900 alone, six rebellions occurred and 437 military actions were taken to obtain control of Venezuela. With the military controlling Venezuela for much of its history, the country practiced a "military ethos", with civilians today still believing that military intervention in the government is positive, especially during times of crisis, with many Venezuelans believing that the military opens democratic opportunities instead of blocking them.

Much of the modern political movement behind the Fifth Republic of Venezuela, ruled by the Bolivarian government established by Hugo Chávez, was built on the following of Bolívar and such militaristic ideals.

See also

Jingoism
Militarization of police
Stratocracy

References
Notes

Further reading

 Bacevich, Andrew J. The New American Militarism. Oxford: University Press, 2005.
 Barr, Ronald J. "The Progressive Army: US Army Command and Administration 1870–1914." St. Martin's Press, Inc. 1998. .
 Barzilai, Gad. Wars, Internal Conflicts and Political Order. Albany: State University of New York Press. 1996.
 Bond, Brian. War and Society in Europe, 1870–1970. McGill-Queen's University Press. 1985 
 Conversi, Daniele 2007 'Homogenisation, nationalism and war’, Nations and Nationalism, Vol. 13, no 3, 2007, pp. 1–24
 Ensign, Tod. America's Military Today. The New Press. 2005. .
 Fink, Christina. Living Silence: Burma Under Military Rule. White Lotus Press. 2001. .
 Freedman, Lawrence, Command: The Politics of Military Operations from Korea to Ukraine, Allen Lane, September 2022, 574 pp., 
 Frevert, Ute. A Nation in Barracks: Modern Germany, Military Conscription and Civil Society. Berg, 2004. 
 Huntington, Samuel P.. Soldier and the State: The Theory and Politics of Civil-Military Relations. Cambridge: Belknap Press of Harvard University Press, 1981.
 Ito, Tomohide: Militarismus des Zivilen in Japan 1937–1940: Diskurse und ihre Auswirkungen auf politische Entscheidungsprozesse (Reihe zur Geschichte Asiens; Bd. 19). Iudicium Verlag, München 2019. 
 Ritter, Gerhard. The Sword and the Scepter; the Problem of Militarism in Germany, translated from the German by Heinz Norden, Coral Gables, Fla., University of Miami Press 1969–73.
 Vagts, Alfred. A History of Militarism. Meridian Books, 1959.
 Western, Jon. Selling Intervention and War. Johns Hopkins University . 2005. 

 
Political theories
Military strategy
Military sociology